The Namibian Military School is a training unit of the Namibian Defence Force. It is the premier training institution of the Namibian military and offers a variety of training ranging from basic military training to mechanical training

History
The school traces its roots back to the Namibian Liberation struggle when the forerunner to today's military school was established in late 1979 as the "SWA Military School" by the South West African Territorial Force during the South African administration of Namibia. The school is the primary training unit of the force. It is partly based at the Osona Military base outside Okahandja. It is the NDF training institution that offers the six-month basic military training (BMT) to all recruits wanting a career in the Namibian Defence Force. The school also conducts training for all officer cadets in the force.

Training offered

The school offers and hosts a variety of military training institutions and courses including language, computer, and military police course. The Automotive school trains technical services auto mechanics. The driving school trains military personnel in operating and maintaining vehicles. A cadet officers' course is run at the military school.

Central medical training school
A central medical training facility is being built at the Namibian Military School. The wing is commanded by Lt Col Amutenya.

Signals training school
Formerly a wing, the signals training school trains military communications specialists. Signals courses offered include Communication Course, Signal Officers Course and Computer Courses. It is currently under construction.

Recruit training
As the primary training institution, basic training for all NDF recruits is undertaken at the Osona military base outside Okahandja. An extension of the school is also located at the Ondangwa Military Base where basic training for recruits can also take place. Basic training for recruits is six months long, and is offered in two phases, Basic Military Training and Platoon Weapons.

Some of the military aspects covered include drills, field craft, skill at arms, minor tactics, coin ops, military hygiene, military law, military aspects, first aid, map reading, law of armed conflict and conventional warfare.

Central support structure for peacekeeping missions
Being set up with German assistance, the facility will consist of training workshops for plumbing, carpentry, welding, electricity and bricklaying artisans. The central support unit aims to capacitance the military when it deploys on peace support operations.

Commandants

References

Military of Namibia
Military academies